Désiré Louesse (23 January 1898 – 29 April 1960) was a Belgian racing cyclist. He rode in the 1928 Tour de France.

References

1898 births
1960 deaths
Belgian male cyclists
Place of birth missing